Nosmeh (also Romanized as Nasmeh; also known as Nosmeh-ye ‘Olyā, Now Sām, Nowsmeh, and Nusmeh) is a village in Shamshir Rural District, in the Central District of Paveh County, Kermanshah Province, North-Western Iran. At the 2006 census, its population was 476, in 131 families.

References 

Populated places in Paveh County